The Junior Wallabies is the national under-20 team that represents Australia playing rugby union. The team has been competing at the annual World Rugby U20 Championship since it began in 2008, replacing the previously held under-19 and under-21 championships. The team also competes at the Oceania U20 Championship as of 2015.

Australia's highest finish at the World Rugby Under 20 Championship was as runner-up in 2010 and 2019. The team finished third in 2011 by beating France in the third place playoff, and fourth in 2009 after losing to South Africa 32–5 in the third place playoff.

Team name
The Junior Wallabies name was incorporated into the Australian under-20 crest prior to the 2018 season, but the name was also previously applied to several other teams in the history of Australian rugby. In the era of amateur rugby from the 1950s onwards, the Junior Wallabies team was selected from uncapped players (with no age restriction) to play against touring Test sides or to represent Australia on goodwill tours to Asia and the Pacific. Media publications sometimes also used the name Junior Wallabies to refer to age-graded national teams such as the Australian under 19 side, Australian Schoolboys, and later the Australian under 20 team.

Overall record
Summary for all under 20 matches at the World and Oceania championships up to and including the 2022 Oceania Championship:

Results

2022

2022 World Championship
No tournament in 2022.

2022 Oceania Championship – 3rd place

2020 to 2021
No competition due to impacts of the COVID-19 pandemic.

2019

2019 World Championship – 2nd place

2019 Oceania Championship – 1st place

2018

2018 World Championship – 5th place

2018 Oceania Championship – 2nd place

2017

2017 World Championship – 6th place

2017 Oceania Championship – 2nd place

2016

2016 World Championship – 6th place

2016 Oceania Championship – 2nd place

2015

2015 World Championship – 5th place

2015 Oceania Championship – 2nd place

2014 and earlier

2014 World Championship – 5th place

2013 World Championship – 7th place

2012 World Championship – 8th place

2011 World Championship – 3rd place

2010 World Championship – 2nd place

2009 World Championship – 4th place

2008 World Championship – 5th place

Squads

Current squad
The squad for the 2019 World Rugby Under 20 Championship is:

Previous squads

{{divhide
 |The squad for the 2015 World Rugby Under 20 Championship:
 |color=#f2f2f2
}}Props Cameron Orr
 Matthew Sandell
 Aaron Pleash
 Fereti Sa'aga
 Tyrel LomaxHookers Folau Fainga'a
 Connal McInerneyLocks Ned Hanigan
 Lukhan Lealaiauloto-Tui
 Riley WinterBack row Olly Kamp
 Sam Croke
 Adam Korczyk
 Lolo Fakaosilea
 Michael Gunn
 Brad WilkinScrum-halves James Tuttle
 Harry NuciforaFly-halves Andrew Deegan
 James DalgleishCentres Campbell Magnay
 Sione Tuipulotu
 Duncan Paia'auaWingers Alex Newsome
 Tyson Davis
 Conrad Quick
 Andrew Kellaway (c)Fullbacks Jonah PlacidManagement Adrian Thompson - Head Coach
 Michael Grice - Team Manager
 Shane Arnold - Assistant Coach
 Cam Blades - Assistant Coach
 Alan Gaffney - SelectorProps Allan Alaalatoa
 Rory O'Connor
 Cameron Orr
 Joel Penders
 Tom RobertsonHookers Harry Scoble
 Tevita VeaLocks Jack Payne
 Matt Philip
 Tom Staniforth (vc)Back row Jack Dempsey
 Ross Haylett-Petty
 Sean McMahon (c)
 Rowan Perry
 Patrick SioScrum-halves Joe Powell
 Angus PulverFly-halves David Horwitz
 Jake McIntyreCentres Luke Burton
 Lalakai Foketi (vc)
 Andrew Robinson
 Jim StewartWingers Andrew Kellaway
 Brad LaceyFullbacks Thomas Banks
 Jonah Placid
 Jonny VauxManagement'''
 Adrian Thompson - Head Coach
 Michael Grice - Team Manager
 Shane Arnold - Assistant Coach
 Cam Blades - Assistant Coach
 Campbell Hanson - Physiotherapist
 Steve Freeman - Team Doctor
 Carl Marshall - Video Analyst
 Simon Harries - Strength & Conditioning
 Alan Gaffney - Selector

Head coaches
 2020-Current: Nathan Grey
 2018–2019: Jason Gilmore
 2017: Simon Cron 
 2013–2016: Adrian Thompson 
 2009–2012: David Nucifora
 2008: Brian Melrose

Honours
World Junior Championship
Runners-up (2): 2010, 2019

Oceania Junior Championship
 Winners (1): 2019
 Runners-up (4): 2015, 2016, 2017, 2018

See also

 Australian Under 20 Rugby Championship
 Australia national under-19 rugby union team
 Australia national under-21 rugby union team

References

External links
 Australia U-20

Rugby Australia Under 20
Oceanian national under-20 rugby union teams